The 1995 Metro Conference men's basketball tournament was held March 10–12 at Freedom Hall in Louisville, Kentucky. 

Louisville defeated  in the championship game, 78–64, to win their 11th Metro men's basketball tournament. The Cardinals received an automatic bid to the 1995 NCAA tournament.

This was the final Metro Conference men's basketball tournament, as five members of the Metro Conference and six members of the Great Midwest Conference joined to form Conference USA. The inaugural Conference USA men's basketball tournament was played March 7–9, 1996.

Format
All seven of the conference's members participated. They were seeded based on regular season conference records, with the top team earning a bye into the semifinal round. The other six teams entered into the preliminary first round.

Bracket

References

Metro Conference men's basketball tournament
Tournament
Metro Conference men's basketball tournament
Metro Conference men's basketball tournament